Docabilly is an album by American folk music artist Doc Watson, released in 1995.

Guests include Duane Eddy and Marty Stuart.

Reception

Writing for Allmusic, music critic Mark Allan wrote of the album "...this album delivers some joyous, rollicking rockabilly, mixing early rock & roll classics with some country comforts. Although his singing strains a bit on the slow numbers, this American treasure comes through in grand style on the upbeat tunes."

Track listing
 "Shake, Rattle & Roll" (Charles E. Calhoun) – 3:04
 "Walking After Midnight" (Alan Block, Don Hecht) – 3:18
 "Heartbreak Hotel" (Mae Boren Axton, Thomas Durden, Elvis Presley) – 2:14
 "My Special Angel" (Jimmy Duncan) – 2:54
 "That's Why I Love You Like I Do" (Jack Marrow) – 2:33
 "What Am I Living For?" (Art Harris, Fred Jacobson) – 4:07
 "Bird Dog" (Felice Bryant, Boudleaux Bryant) – 3:48
 "Little Things Mean a Lot" (Edith Calisch, Carl Stutz) – 3:00
 "Train of Love" (Johnny Cash) – 2:20
 "Thunder Road/Sugarfoot Rag" (Hank Garland, Vaughn Horton, Mitchum, Raye) – 2:24
 "Love Is a Lonely Street" (Ella Barrett, Faye Cunningham) – 3:15
 "Singing the Blues" (Melvin Endsley) – 2:56

Personnel
Doc Watson – guitar, vocals
Jack Lawrence – guitar
T. Michael Coleman – bass
Junior Brown – steel guitar
Mike Auldridge – guitar, lap steel guitar
Duane Eddy – guitar
Roy M. "Junior" Huskey – bass
Larry Knechtel – piano
Alan O'Bryant – harmony vocals
Moondi Klein – harmony vocals
Marty Stuart – mandolin, guitar
Pat McInerney – drums
Production notes
Produced by T. Michael Coleman
Engineered by Randy Best
Mixed by T. Michael Coleman, Bill Wolf
Mastered by David Glasser, Bill Wolf
Design by Bob Murray

References

External links
 Doc Watson discography

1995 albums
Doc Watson albums
Sugar Hill Records albums